Eiji Kitamura  (born  April 8, 1929) is a Japanese jazz clarinetist and tenor saxophonist originally from Tokyo who made his debut at the age of 22.

Kitamura devoted himself to clarinet playing while still an undergraduate at Keio University in Tokyo. He first came to prominence in the U.S. at the 20th Anniversary Jam Session of the Monterey Jazz Festival in 1977. His following in Japan was built previous to this on his regular television program.

He prefers to interpret traditional swing jazz rather than modern jazz, and according to Allmusic is most strongly influenced by Benny Goodman and Woody Herman.

Discography
 Swing Sessions (RCA, 1978)
 Swing Eiji (Concord Jazz, 1981)
 Seven Stars (Concord Jazz, 1982)

See also 
Yoshiaki Miyanoue

References

External links
Official website (in Japanese)

Japanese jazz clarinetists
Musicians from Tokyo
1929 births
Living people
RCA Records artists
Concord Records artists
21st-century clarinetists